Ysabella Brave is an American YouTube personality, artist, vocalist, singer and songwriter signed by Cordless Recordings, a division of the Warner Music Group.  She was discovered through the popularity of her YouTube channels, Ysabella Brave and ysabellabravetalk.

Career
Brave was signed as a recording artist for Cordless Recordings, an e-label of the Warner Music Group.

Brave is mentioned prominently in the book YouTube for Dummies, written by Doug Sahlin and Chris Botello and published by Wiley Publishing, . Brave is also mentioned prominently in the book 15 Minutes of Fame: Becoming a Star in the YouTube Revolution, written by Frederick Levy, .

Brave, during her career as a singer, has worked as a fraud analyst for Yahoo! and studied at San Jose State University.

Brave was a finalist in the Miss Horrorfest 2006 contest and has had other show business experience throughout her life.

YouTube videos
Brave is a YouTube personality. She posted the first videos of herself singing on YouTube on July 14, 2006. Most of her songs are accompanied by prerecorded music tracks, but some are a cappella. Her singing genres include blues, jazz, the Great American Songbook, rock, soul, R&B, and pop music, amongst others, as well as some of her own original lyrics and music.

After over a year of regularly posting videos, Brave built up a large following on YouTube. Her Ysabella Brave channel has 21.4K subscribers. Brave's videos were viewed 9.7 million times, as of July 10, 2021.

Brave's second YouTube channel, ysabellabravetalk, was created on February 25, 2007, to separate her music and comedy videos from those in which she expresses personal opinions on subjects raised by her viewers, and her vlogs. The first video on her talk channel was posted on March 4, 2007. As of October 16, 2010, this second channel has 13,701 subscribers.

Brave's most popular video is "Everyday Bravery" on her ysabellabravetalk channel. It currently has 828,365 views (August 20, 2013).

See also
 List of YouTube celebrities

References

External links 

 ysabellabrave at YouTube
 ysabellabravetalk at YouTube
 "ysabellaART" — Artwork of Ysabella Brave, on YouTube

Living people
1979 births
American YouTubers
San Jose State University alumni
Yahoo! employees
Nonviolence advocates
Actresses from California
Singer-songwriters from California
American women singer-songwriters
American women in electronic music
American synth-pop musicians
Crow tribe
Native American actresses
Native American poets
Native American singers
Native American songwriters
Cordless Recordings artists
Warner Records artists
21st-century American women singers
21st-century American singers
Native American women writers